Pardosa atromedia is a species of wolf spider in the family Lycosidae. It is found in the United States.

References

atromedia
Spiders described in 1904
Spiders of the United States